Besseling is a surname. Notable people with the surname include:

Alice Besseling (1944–2014), Dutch politician
J.F. Besseling (1928–2015), Dutch professor
Peter Besseling (born 1970), Australian politician
Wil Besseling (born 1985), Dutch golfer